Ramsey Wallace was an actor in silent films. His work included leading roles. He starred in A Voice in the Dark (film). He received a favorable review for his leading role in The Call of Home.

He worked as a promoter after his film career and died of a brain tumor in 1933.

Selected filmography
Her Only Way (1918)
The Grain of Dust (1918)
Her Beloved Villain (1920)
The Woman in His House (1920)
The Rage of Paris (1921)
A Voice in the Dark (film) (1921)
The Call of Home (1921)
 Luring Lips (1921)
Little Wildcat (1922)
Human Hearts (1922)
 The Call of Home (1922)
The Girl I Loved (1923)
The Drivin' Fool (1923) 
 Gossip (1923)
The Little Wildcat (1923)
The Extra Girl (1923)
Broken Laws (1924)
Empty Hands (1924)
Chalk Marks (1924)

References

1933 deaths
American male silent film actors
20th-century American male actors